Bank of New Orleans (BNO) was a bank headquartered in Metairie, Louisiana. It was a subsidiary of Louisiana Bancorp, Inc., a bank holding company. It operated 4 branches, all of which were in Louisiana, including a branch at 1010 Common. In 2015, the company was acquired by Home Bancorp, Inc.

History
The bank was founded in 1909.

On May 23, 2007, it became a public company via an initial public offering.

In 2008, the bank declined to receive an investment from the United States Department of the Treasury as part of the Troubled Asset Relief Program.

On September 15, 2015, the bank was acquired by Home Bancorp, Inc. for $75 million.

References

Defunct banks of the United States
1909 establishments in Louisiana
Banks established in 1909
2015 disestablishments in Louisiana
Banks disestablished in 2015